Rapid Roulette is an Irish television quiz show. Four contestants compete to answer quick-fire general knowledge questions to win cash and prizes. The title refers to the show's roulette wheel that contestants spin throughout the course of the game to determine their cash and/or prizes.

The programme ran between 30 September 1986 and 6 March 1990 and was produced by Green Apple Productions, and later by Strongbow, for RTÉ.

Presenters
The series was originally hosted by actor Maurie Taylor, who left the show after the first series and was replaced by former singer Maxi.

References

1986 Irish television series debuts
1990 Irish television series endings
Irish quiz shows
RTÉ original programming
1990s Irish television series
1980s Irish television series